Nicolaas Jan Jerôme "Nico" Bouvij (11 July 1892 – 14 June 1957) was a Dutch amateur football player who competed in the 1912 Summer Olympics.

Club career
Bouvy was born in Banda Neira, Banda Islands. He started playing football at DFC, playing alongside his three brothers. He made his senior debut in 1910, had a season in Germany with Altona 1893 Hamburg and played the remainder of his career for HFC.

In May 1924, when Victoria Hamburg played Cardiff City in a friendly (2–2), Nico Bouvy was invited to strengthen Vicky´s side which he did under a special DFB one-off licence. His brother, Dolf Bouvy, had been a regular Victoria player in 1906.

He died in The Hague, Netherlands.

International career
Bouvy made his debut for the Netherlands in a March 1912 friendly match against England and earned a total of nine caps, scoring four goals. His final international was a November 1913 friendly match against England. He won the bronze medal with the Dutch at the 1912 Summer Olympics football tournament.

References

External links
 
 

1892 births
1957 deaths
People from Maluku (province)
Dutch footballers
Association football forwards
Netherlands international footballers
Footballers at the 1912 Summer Olympics
Medalists at the 1912 Summer Olympics
Olympic footballers of the Netherlands
Olympic bronze medalists for the Netherlands
Olympic medalists in football
FC Dordrecht players
Altonaer FC von 1893 players
Koninklijke HFC players
Dutch expatriate footballers
Dutch expatriate sportspeople in Germany
Expatriate footballers in Germany